Henry Joseph Cote  (February 19, 1864 – April 28, 1940) was a Major League Baseball catcher who played with the Louisville Colonels in 1894 and 1895. His minor league career stretched from 1890 to 1910.

External links
  Baseball-Reference

1864 births
1940 deaths
Louisville Colonels players
19th-century baseball players
Major League Baseball catchers
Baseball players from New York (state)
Troy Trojans (minor league) players
Binghamton Bingos players
Wilkes-Barre Coal Barons players
Altoona Mud Turtles players
Lancaster Chicks players
Norfolk Clams players
Norfolk Crows players
Allentown Goobers players
Houston Buffaloes players
Norfolk Jewels players
Grand Rapids Cabinet Makers players
Wheeling Stogies players
Grand Rapids Furniture Makers players
Springfield Wanderers players
Columbus Senators players
Sioux City Cornhuskers players
Des Moines Hawkeyes players
Ilion Typewriters players
Minneapolis Millers (baseball) players
Lawrence Colts players
Roanoke Tigers players
Columbia Gamecocks players
Greenville Spinners players
Winston-Salem Twins players